Daniel Sales (1958–2005), usually credited as Dan Sales, was an American film producer. He was the associate, executive or supervising producer for movies such as Skinner (1993), Brand New World (1998), Stranded (2001), Alone in the Dark (2005) and BloodRayne (2005).

External links

1958 births
2005 deaths
American film producers